Izimka (İzem) is a rural locality (a village) in Nureyevsky Selsoviet, Sharansky District, Bashkortostan, Russia. The population was 70 as of 2010. There is 1 street.

Geography 
Izimka is located 27 km southeast of Sharan (the district's administrative centre) by road. Nureyevo is the nearest rural locality.

References 

Rural localities in Sharansky District